St James's Church, Manorbier is a Grade I-listed parish church in Manorbier, Pembrokeshire, Wales. The church dates from the 12th century, and has been considerably altered over the years, though medieval ceiling paintings in the porch survive. The church has a slender tower of the local type and a bellcote. The chancel was built in about 1250 on older foundations with the transepts added in the same period.

There are three military graves in the churchyard dating between 1918 and 1920 that are looked after by the Commonwealth War Graves Commission.

References

External links
Notes on Manorbier Church, Pembrokeshire by A. H. Wratislaw, M.A.
Historical information and sources on GENUKI
Artwork at St James's Church, Manorbier

12th-century church buildings in Wales
Grade I listed churches in Pembrokeshire